Yelistratov or Elistratov is a Russian masculine surname, its feminine counterpart is Yelistratova or Elistratova. It may refer to
Semion Elistratov (born 1990), Russian speed skater
Yuliya Yelistratova (born 1988), Ukrainian triathlete

Russian-language surnames